The Iron Man: The Musical by Pete Townshend, released in 1989, is an adaptation of Ted Hughes' story The Iron Man, produced and largely composed and performed by Pete Townshend of The Who. It also stars Roger Daltrey, Deborah Conway, John Lee Hooker, and Nina Simone. It is Townshend's fifth studio album.

The three then-surviving original members of The Who (Daltrey, John Entwistle, and Townshend) performed as a group in two songs, "Dig" and "Fire", although the latter was a cover of The Crazy World of Arthur Brown's hit. (The Who would later perform "Dig" live during their 1989 reunion tour.)

"A Friend Is a Friend" and "I Won't Run Anymore" were commercially released as singles; "Fire" was issued as a promo-only single in the United States.  Cash Box said that "A Friend is a Friend" "finds Pete in an uplifting vein, with falsetto vocals and strummed guitar."

A stage version was mounted at the Young Vic theatre in London in 1993. On the strength of this, Warner Bros. optioned the story for a movie which, with a very different adaptation of the story, became The Iron Giant; Townshend received an Executive Producer credit.

Characters
Hogarth: Pete Townshend
The Vixen: Deborah Conway
The Iron Man: John Lee Hooker
The Space Dragon: Nina Simone
Hogarth's Father: Roger Daltrey
The Crow: Chyna
The Jay: Nicola Emmanuelle
The Frog: Billy Nicholls
The Owl: Simon Townshend
The Badger: Cleveland Watkiss

Track listing
All songs written by Pete Townshend except where noted.
 "I Won't Run Any More" – 4:51 Vocals by Pete Townshend with Deborah Conway
 "Over the Top" – 3:31 Vocals by John Lee Hooker
 "Man Machines" – 0:42 Vocals by Simon Townshend
 "Dig" – 4:07 Performed by The Who
 "A Friend Is a Friend" – 4:44 Vocals by Pete Townshend
 "I Eat Heavy Metal" – 4:01 Vocals by John Lee Hooker
 "All Shall Be Well" – 4:02 Vocals by Pete Townshend with Deborah Conway and Chyna
 "Was There Life" – 4:19 Vocals by Pete Townshend
 "Fast Food" – 4:26 Vocals by Nina Simone
 "A Fool Says..." – 2:51 Vocals by Pete Townshend
 "Fire" (Arthur Brown, Vincent Crane, Mike Finesilver, Peter Ker) – 3:47 Performed by The Who
 "New Life/Reprise" – 6:00 Vocals by Chyna with Pete Townshend and Nicola Emmanuel.  Contains small extract of a live performance of "Magic Bus"

Bonus tracks from the 2006 US Hip-O Records release
 "Dig" (Simon Townshend vocal version) – 4:09
 "Man Machines" (long version) – 4:34
 "I Eat Heavy Metal" (demo) – 4:04

Bonus tracks from the 2006 Japanese Imperial release
 "A Friend Is a Friend" (live at the Fillmore West, 1996)
 "All Shall Be Well" (live at the Fillmore West, 1996)

Non-album tracks
 "Real World" (instrumental released on 12" and CD singles of "A Friend Is a Friend", a different mix of it was on Scoop 3 in 2001)
 "Penny Drop" (appeared on the Timothy White Radio Show; promo copies of the interview were pressed on vinyl by DIR Broadcasting)
 "Dig" (demo released on the 1989 UK CD single of "I Won't Run Anymore")
 "Iron Man Recitative", "Can You Really Dance?", and "Man and Machines (demo)" appeared on Scoop 3 in 2001
 "Dig" (concert version appeared on The Who's 1989 reunion tour concert album Join Together)

References

External links 
 Liner notes on songs – Dig, Fire

1989 albums
Concept albums
Pete Townshend albums
1993 musicals
Rock operas
Rock musicals
Atlantic Records albums
Albums produced by Pete Townshend
British musicals
Adaptations of works by Ted Hughes